Naudiyal is a surname of North Indian Brahmans of Hill state Uttarakhand.
Well it is a adapted surname from their village's name i.e naudi. Naudi is a village in pauri garhwal district of uttrakhand.
Naudiyals were primarily bhardhwaj ,jhosi, and bhatt but when they moved to naudi village they changed there surname as naudiyal

Naudiyal villages
 Bustang in Pauri Garhwal
 kwali dhumakot pauri Garhwal
 Kabra in Pauri Garhwal 
 Margaon in Rudraprayag 
 Naudi  in Pauri Garhwal 
 Pujeli in Uttarakashi
 Kumola in Uttarakashi
 Nauli in Tehri Garhwal
 Jhupro in Uttrakhand
 Naudiyalgoan in Pauri Garhwal
 Aali Bhumli in Pauri Garhwal 
 malli Bhimali, Talli Bhimali in Pauri Gharwal
 Kanakot, Paithani in Pauri Garhwal
 Sediyakhal in Pauri Garhwal

Surnames
Indian surnames
Surnames of Indian origin
Surnames of Hindustani origin
Hindu surnames
Himalayan peoples
Social groups of India
Social groups of Uttarakhand
Brahmin communities of Uttarakhand